The Hazardous Area Response Team (HART) is a capability of the NHS ambulance services in the United Kingdom devoted to providing paramedic and enhanced medical care to patients in the "hot zone" of hazardous environments.

Capabilities

HART is deployed to various hazardous, complex or prolonged incidents.  The national capabilities include:

 CBRN/HazMat - CBRNe and hazmat incidents
 High Consequence Infectious Disease (HCID) - caring for patients with highly contagious diseases including viral haemorrhagic fevers such as Ebola and smallpox.
 USAR Urban Search and Rescue - responding to patients at height, in confined space or collapsed or unstable buildings)
 Water operations - flood and swift water rescue
 MTA - tactical medical operations in terrorist or firearms incidents
 Security operations - supporting police officers during hazardous operations.

All HART teams within the ambulance services of England & Wales have the same capabilities. allowing interoperable activities at large scale incidents or planned events such as the Olympic Games or UN 2021 United Nations Climate Change Conference (CoP26) conference. The Northern Ireland team has additional capabilities covering mountain rescue taskings.

Each HART unit consist of emergency medical personnel, primarily paramedics, who have undergone specialised training at the National Ambulance Resilience Unit (NARU) Education Centre in the use of safety critical procedures, skills, vehicles and equipment. Their specialised equipment includes personal protective equipment (such as breathing apparatus, hazmat suits, and safe work at height equipment, and flotation devices and for working in water.

Origins

The HART capability originated from a 2004 report on the feasibility of paramedics working in the hot zone or inner cordon of major incidents. and the programme was established following the 2005 London Bombings.  HART forms part of the health response in support of the National Capabilities Programme being led by the Home Office, which aims to ensure that fewer lives would be risked or lost in the event of a terrorist-related attack or accidental CBRN incident as part of the government and emergency services' "Model Response" plans.

Notable deployments

 2011 Gleision Colliery mining accident, Wales
 2011 M5 crash, Taunton, Somerset
 2012 Summer Olympics and 2012 Summer Paralympics, London
 2013 Glasgow helicopter crash
 2014 Wales summit of NATO, Newport, Wales
 2017 Manchester Arena bombing
 2017 Westminster attack, London
 2017 London Bridge attack
 2018 Poisoning of Sergei and Yulia Skripal, Salisbury, Wiltshire
 2018 2018 Amesbury poisonings, Wiltshire
 2021 United Nations Climate Change Conference (CoP 26), Glasgow, Scotland

Fleet

The first generation HART fleet consisted of Iveco Daily, Land Rover Discovery and Volvo XC70 response vehicles, now decommissioned, with a separate Iveco primemover carrying a Polaris 6x6 ATV.

The second generation HART fleet consists of the following vehicles supplied by WAS.

 3x Primary Response Vehicle (Volkswagen Transporter)
 3x Secondary Response Vehicle (Mercedes Sprinter)
 1x Staff Welfare Vehicle (Mercedes Sprinter)
 MAN 7.5t primemover with Polaris 6x6 ATV

The operational fleet is supported by 2x Crew Carriers (Mercedes Sprinter converted by Wilker)

Operational areas
HART is operational in every NHS ambulance service in the United Kingdom, although In Scotland they are referred to as the Special Operations Response Team.

Similar capabilities exist within the Isle of Man Ambulance Service.

References

External links
 National Ambulance Resilience Unit
 Ambulance HART

Emergency medical services in the United Kingdom